Belly-Cresus Ganira (born 25 March 2000) is a Burundian swimmer. He competed in the men's 100m freestyle event at the 2020 Summer Olympics. His time of 54.33 seconds did not qualify for the semifinals.

Early years
Ganira grew up in the Kinanira II neighborhood of Bujumbura. He began swimming at the age of four and joined a competitive club at age 10.

Career
In 2019, Ganira was awarded a grant to train at the FINA Development Centre in Dakar, Senegal for one year.

Ganira broke six national records at the 2020 African Zone 2 Championships in Ghana, improving on five of his own records and breaking Billy-Scott Irakose's mark in the 50 metre freestyle event.

References

External links
 

Living people
2000 births
Burundian male swimmers
Olympic swimmers of Burundi
Swimmers at the 2020 Summer Olympics
African Games competitors for Burundi
Swimmers at the 2019 African Games
21st-century Burundian people
Sportspeople from Bujumbura